Scudderia furcata is a species in the family Tettigoniidae ("katydids"), in the order Orthoptera ("grasshoppers, crickets, katydids"). A common name for Scudderia furcata is fork-tailed bush katydid. The distribution range of Scudderia furcata includes Central America and North America.

References

Further reading
 
 Field Guide To Grasshoppers, Katydids, And Crickets Of The United States, Capinera, Scott, Walker. 2004. Cornell University Press.
 Otte, Daniel (1997). Tettigonioidea. Orthoptera Species File 7, 373.

External links
NCBI Taxonomy Browser, Scudderia furcata

Scudderia
Insects described in 1878